The English rock band Electric Light Orchestra (ELO) recorded over 190 songs from 1971 to 2019. The band's music is characterised by their blending of Beatlesque pop, classical arrangements, and futuristic iconography.

In 1971 the band released their self-titled debut album, The Electric Light Orchestra (No Answer in the US), the songwriting duties were split between band members Roy Wood and Jeff Lynne, Wood's songs were more classically influenced than Lynne's art rock influenced songs. Before the release of ELO 2 (1973, Electric Light Orchestra II in the US) Wood left the band, making Lynne the sole songwriter. The album contained a cover of the song "Roll Over Beethoven", the single would be a hit in the US. Later in 1973, On the Third Day marked when the band developed its sound and improvements in Lynne's songwriting. The concept album Eldorado (1974) saw the first time that an orchestra was used, where previously Lynne would overdub strings. The presence of an orchestra would be a common part of future ELO albums. The 1975 album Face the Music moved away from symphonic concept elements of Eldorado in favor of more radio friendly songs.

Songs

Unreleased songs

Notes

References

 
Electric Light Orchestra
Electric Light Orchestra